The List of shipwrecks in 1783 includes some ship sunk, wrecked or otherwise lost during 1783.

January

3 January

9 January

15 January

17 January

21 January

Unknown date

February

1 February

3 February

4 February

7 February

9 February

10 February

12 February

14 February

15 February

17 February

19 February

21 February

25 February

28 February

Unknown date

March

2 March

3 March

5 March

6 March

25 March

28 March

29 March

Unknown date

April

4 April

8 April

19 April

27 April

Unknown date

May

2 May

22 May

24 May

26 May

Unknown date

June

3 June

10 June

15 June

18 June

20 June

Unknown date

July

6 July

7 July

11 July

25 July

30 July

Unknown date

August

9 August

10 August

21 August

23 August

24 August

Unknown date

September

5 September

6 September

9 September

19 September

21 September

Unknown date

October

3 October

4 October

11 October

24 October

Unknown date

November

2 November

5 November

6 November

7 November

13 November

14 November

15 November

16 November

17 November

18 November

21 November

22 November

23 November

25 November

29 November

Unknown date

December

8 December

9 December

20 December

24 December

Unknown date

Unknown date

References

1783